Barnebydendron riedelii, also known as monkey-flower tree, is a species of flowering plants in the legume family, Fabaceae. It belongs to the subfamily Detarioideae. It is the only member of the genus Barnebydendron. It is a tree reaching 10–12 m in height with scarlet red flowers. Originally it came from tropical dry forests of Central America and tropical South America but it has been extensively grown in tropical areas worldwide as a garden tree.

References

External links
The Monkey Flower Trees
GRIN Species Records of Barnebydendron (as Phyllocarpus)
Phyllocarpus riedelii Tul. - Flora Brasiliensis

Detarioideae
Monotypic Fabaceae genera
Trees of Guatemala
Trees of Thailand
Trees of Pakistan